Damián Joel Giménez (born February 26, 1982) is an Argentinian football player, who most recently played for Cerro Largo in the Uruguayan Primera División. He also holds an Italian passport. Giménez is a left-sided defender, but can also operate in midfield.

Club career
Most of his early career Giménez spent with Banfield in Argentina. In 2005, he played in the Copa Libertadores with Banfield. The club reached the quarterfinals of that tournament, losing 3-4 to River Plate on aggregate. He has also spent two seasons playing in Italy with Pescara in Serie B. After spending the first year in Italy, Giménez moved back to Argentina due to family problems. He returned for the following season but had lost his starting spot. On February 7, 2007 he moved to Nueva Chicago to play in the Torneo Clausura of the Primera División Argentina. The team finished in 15th place and was relegated to Primera B Nacional Argentina. Because of the relegation he was available on a free transfer. In July 2007 he underwent a trial at Heart of Midlothian F.C. in Scotland. He impressed the Hearts staff on their pre-season tour of Austria, and was offered a one-year contract, but failed to agree personal terms. Later the same summer he had a trial with Bristol City F.C. While on tour in Latvia with Bristol City F.C. he broke his nose during a match. On August 1, 2007 he signed with the Ukrainian side Chornomorets.

On 18 December 2009, Alki announced the signing of Damian Gimenez until the end of the season.

National team
Giménez has been capped at the U20 level, and has been called up to train with the senior team. He has 15 caps for the U20 team, but, so far, no official matches at the senior level. He just missed making the U20 squad, which went on to win a gold medal at the 2001 FIFA World Youth Championship.

References

External links
Interview with Giménez  on FC Chornomorets official site (in Russian)
Statistics on Guardian Unlimited Football 

1982 births
Living people
People from Lomas de Zamora
Argentine footballers
Club Atlético Banfield footballers
Newell's Old Boys footballers
Nueva Chicago footballers
FC Chornomorets Odesa players
Delfino Pescara 1936 players
Alki Larnaca FC players
Argentine Primera División players
Ukrainian Premier League players
Serie B players
Cypriot Second Division players
Argentine expatriate footballers
Expatriate footballers in Ukraine
Expatriate footballers in Italy
Expatriate footballers in Cyprus
Argentine expatriate sportspeople in Ukraine
Argentine expatriate sportspeople in Italy
Argentine expatriate sportspeople in Cyprus
Association football defenders
Association football midfielders
Sportspeople from Buenos Aires Province